The 1925 Villanova Wildcats football team was an American football team that represented Villanova University as an independent during the 1925 college football season. The team compiled a 6–2–1 record and outscored opponents by a total of 107 to 40. In March 1925, the school hired Harry Stuhldreher as its new head coach.  Stuhldreher was the quarterback at Notre Dame from 1922 to 1924, a three-time All-American and member of the legendary "Four Horsemen" backfield. James Callaghan was the team captain. The team played its three home games at Shibe Park in Philadelphia.

Schedule

References

Villanova
Villanova Wildcats football seasons
Villanova Wildcats football